Turid Dørumsgaard Varsi (born 3 June 1938 in Tinn) is a Norwegian politician for the Labour Party.

She was elected to the Norwegian Parliament from Telemark in 1977, but was not re-elected in 1981.

On the local level she was a member of Tokke municipal council from 1971 to 1975. She returned as a deputy member of their executive committee from 1995 to 2003.

Outside politics she spent her career in the school system, having settled in Høydalsmo.

References

1938 births
Living people
Members of the Storting
Politicians from Telemark
Labour Party (Norway) politicians
Women members of the Storting
20th-century Norwegian politicians
20th-century Norwegian women politicians
People from Tinn